The John C. Stagg House, is located in Wyckoff, Bergen County, New Jersey, United States. The home was built in 1812 by John C. Stagg on the foundation of a former house that was built by his father, Cornelius Stagg. John Stagg operated a grocery store out of the basement of the house. The house was added to the National Register of Historic Places on January 10, 1983.

See also 

 National Register of Historic Places listings in Bergen County, New Jersey

References

Houses on the National Register of Historic Places in New Jersey
Houses in Bergen County, New Jersey
National Register of Historic Places in Bergen County, New Jersey
Wyckoff, New Jersey
New Jersey Register of Historic Places